Warrior Dubz is a dubstep compilation released in 2006 on the Planet Mu label. The album was compiled by Mary Anne Hobbs.

Track listing
Milanese vs. Virus Syndicate: Dead Man Walking (3:38)
Benga: Music Box (5:08)
Andy Stott: Black (6:45)
Amit: Too Many Freedoms (5:18)
Digital Mystikz (vocals: Spen G): Anti War Dub (6:23)
JME (production: Wiley): Pence (2:53)
Burial: Versus (6:13)
Plastician (vocals: Fresh, Napper & Shizzle): Cha Vocal (3:26)
The Bug (vocals: Flowdan): Jah War (3:02)
Terror Danjah (vocals: Bruza, Mz Bratt): Give It To 'Em (3:03)
Various Production and MC Vez: In This (2:16) (promo release only)
Spor: Hydra (6:44)
Loefah (vocals: Sgt Pokes): Mud VIP (5:38)
DJ Distance & Crazy D: Worries Again (3:52)
Kode9 and The Spaceape: Kingstown (4:41)

References

2006 compilation albums
Dubstep albums